Municipio is an underground metro station that serves Line 1 of the Naples Metro, and in future will serve Line 6 of the metro system. It is located in the quarters of Porto. The station opened on 2 June 2015, being added to the section of the line opened earlier.

See also
 Railway stations in Italy
 List of Naples metro stations

References

Naples Metro stations
2015 establishments in Italy
Railway stations opened in 2015
Railway stations in Italy opened in the 21st century